Xianshanosaurus is a genus of sauropod dinosaur from the Early Cretaceous (Aptian-Albian) of the Ruyang Basin in Henan Province, China. Its type and only species is Xianshanosaurus shijiagouensis. It was described in 2009 by a team of paleontologists led by Lü Junchang.  Xianshanosaurus may be a titanosaur, and Daxiatitan may be its closest relative, but its evolutionary relationships remain controversial.

Taxonomy

Xianshanosaurus and its type species X. shijiagouensis were named by Lü Junchang, Xu Li, Jiang Xiaojun, Jia Songhai, Li Ming, Yuan Chongxi, Zhang Xingliao, and Ji Qiang in 2009. The type specimen, accessioned in the Henan Geological Museum, consists of ten caudal vertebrae, a coracoid, a femur, and several ribs. The genus name refers to Xian Mountain, located near where the holotype was found.

Phylogenetic relationships

When Xianshanosaurus was first described, its discoverers noted that it had an unusual mixture of characteristics of titanosaurs and non-titanosaurian sauropods, and classified it as an indeterminate neosauropod. In 2011, Philip Mannion and Jorge Calvo tentatively considered it a titanosaur, and in 2012, Michael D'Emic interpreted it as a lithostrotian titanosaur.

Studies that have included Xianshanosaurus in phylogenetic analyses have regarded it as an unstable taxon. In several studies, it has been recovered as a titanosaur either close to or within Lithostrotia, with Daxiatitan sometimes recovered as its sister taxon. In contrast, Andrew Moore and colleagues found it to be highly unstable, potentially belonging to Titanosauria, Turiasauria, or Euhelopodidae. In the third case, in which Euhelopodidae was recovered as a non-neosauropod clade equivalent to Mamenchisauridae, Moore et al. recovered Daxiatitan as the sister taxon of Xianshanosaurus.

Habitat
Xianshanosaurus shared its habitat with Ruyangosaurus, "Huanghetitan" ruyangensis, Yunmenglong, Luoyanggia, and Zhongyuansaurus. The Haoling Formation was initially thought to be Cenomanian in age, but is now considered Aptian-Albian.

References

Early Cretaceous dinosaurs of Asia
Titanosaurs
Fossil taxa described in 2009
Paleontology in Henan